Repercussion is the second studio album by American power pop band the dB's, released in 1981 by Albion Records. Like its predecessor, Stands for Decibels, the album was commercially unsuccessful but critically acclaimed.

This was the band's final album with the original lineup, as Chris Stamey left in early April 1982.

Background and production
Stamey and Peter Holsapple, the band's dual singers/guitarists, each ended up contributing six songs on the album. As was the case on their debut, Stamey's songs veered towards more experimental melodies and rhythms, while Holsapple's songs were more traditionally in a pop vein.

The album was produced by Scott Litt (later famous for his association with the band R.E.M. and for remixing Nirvana's album In Utero), giving it a "fuller, more modern overall sound".

The first track, Holsapple's "Living a Lie", featured a horn section, the Rumour Brass.

Stamey's "ridiculously catchy" song "Ask for Jill" was about the process of mastering an album.

Holsapple's composition "Amplifier" (about a suicidal man reflecting on how his significant other left him and took all his belongings, save for the titular object) became the band's lead single and also their first video. "Amplifier" was later rerecorded and included on the band's next album, Like This. The original version was later included on Rhino Records' box set Left of the Dial: Dispatches from the '80s Underground.

A video for the second single, "Neverland", was completed but went unreleased until the band uploaded it to their website in 2008.

Track listing
Side 1
 "Living a Lie" – 3:26 (Peter Holsapple)
 "We Were Happy There" – 2:39 (Holsapple)
 "Happenstance" – 4:07 (Chris Stamey)
 "From a Window" – 2:34  (Stamey)
 "Amplifier" – 3:08 (Holsapple)
 "Ask for Jill" – 2:33 (Stamey)

Side 2
"I Feel Good (Today)" – 4:28 (Stamey)
 "Storm Warning" – 2:32 (Holsapple)
 "Ups and Downs" – 3:03 (Stamey)
 "Nothing Is Wrong" – 4:16 (Holsapple)
 "In Spain" – 3:02 (Stamey)
 "Neverland" – 2:46 (Holsapple)

Different versions of the album have been reissued on CD with different bonus tracks, usually either Holsapple's instrumental B-side "PH Factor" or Stamey's "Soul Kiss".

Personnel

The dB's
Chris Stamey – guitar, vocals
Peter Holsapple – guitar, vocals
Gene Holder – bass guitar
Will Rigby – drums

Additional musicians
Andy Clark – additional keyboards
The Rumour Brass:
Chris Gower – trombone
Dick Hansen – trumpet
John "Irish" Earle – saxophones

References

1982 albums
Albums produced by Scott Litt
The dB's albums
I.R.S. Records albums